Intermittency is a behavior of dynamical systems: regular alternation of phases of apparently periodic and chaotic dynamics.

Intermittent or intermittency may also refer to:
Intermittent river or stream, the one that ceases to flow every year or at least twice every five years
Intermittent energy source, renewable energy sources that are not dispatchable due to their fluctuating nature
Intermittent fault,  malfunction of a device or system that occurs at intervals, usually irregular
Fluorescence intermittency, or blinking, is  random switching between ON (bright) and OFF (dark) states
Intermittent control, possibilities between the two extremes of continuous-time and discrete-time control: the control signal

See also